Bethesda North Hospital  is an acute, tertiary, teaching hospital in Montgomery, Ohio, United States that provides a wide range of services to individuals and families throughout the northeast corridor of Cincinnati and into Butler, Clinton and Warren counties. Founded in 1970 as a community satellite facility, Bethesda North is now the fourth largest hospital in Greater Cincinnati. The non-profit hospital is member of TriHealth, a community partnership between Bethesda and Good Samaritan Hospital.

History 
In 1886, seven German Methodist deaconesses moved into a small cottage in Mt. Auburn, devoting their lives to caring for the sick and the poor. Soon their overcrowded cottage became a makeshift miniature hospital. Two years later, the German Methodist Deaconess Home Association purchased a small private hospital at the corner of Oak Street and Reading Road and moved its patients to this location, marking the beginning of Bethesda. In 2000, Bethesda Oak was closed, except for an outpatient clinic, in favor of Bethesda North.

Since its establishment in 1970, Bethesda North Hospital has grown to meet the needs of the community, increasing bed capacity to 235 in 1979 (approximately 360 as of 2017) and opening an outpatient surgery center in 1987. As the community grew, so did its desire for an even larger selection of specialty medical services. Over the years, Bethesda met this need by adding maternity services; providing regionally recognized specialty services, including a breast center, fertility center and endoscopy services; investing in increasingly sophisticated diagnostic imaging and neurological equipment; and offering open-heart surgery. It also is one of only two designated adult Trauma Centers in the area.

In 2003, Bethesda North met demand for higher volume, increased technological sophistication and improved access through a multimillion-dollar expansion. The  expansion has added four new surgical suites to increase operating room capacity by 30 percent. A new cardiac/vascular procedure lab and cardiopulmonary/nuclear medicine expansion also will enhance the care Bethesda North provides.

References

External links 
Bethesda North Hospital

Hospital buildings completed in 1970
Teaching hospitals in Ohio
Montgomery, Ohio
Buildings and structures in Hamilton County, Ohio
Trauma centers
Hospitals established in 1888